Jim Riley may refer to:
Jim Riley (drummer), American drummer
Jim Riley (American football) (born 1945), American football player
Jim Riley (cricketer) (born 1948), New Zealand cricketer
Jim Riley (outfielder) (1886–1949), Major League Baseball player
Jim Riley (ice hockey) (1895–1969), Canadian ice hockey and baseball player
Jim Riley (gunfighter)
Jim Riley (Life of Riley), a fictional character on the BBC sitcom The Life of Riley, portrayed by Neil Dudgeon

See also
James Riley (disambiguation)